Gary Van Tol (February 3, 1967) is an American college baseball coach and former player. He is the manager of the Boise Hawks. Van Tol played college baseball at Treasure Valley Community College from 1986 to 1988 before transferring to Gonzaga University where he played for coach Steve Hertz in 1989 and 1990. He served as the head coach at Centralia College from 1994 to 1995 and Treasure Valley Community College from 1997 to 2001. He was the head baseball coach at Boise State (2020).

Playing career
Van Tol enrolled at Treasure Valley Community College in Ontario, Oregon, and played baseball for the Chukars. After earning an associate degree from TVCC, he transferred to Gonzaga University in Spokane, Washington. As a senior in 1990, Van Tol was named first team All-Pac-10 Conference North Division.

Coaching career
On October 6, 2005, Van Tol returned to Gonzaga as an assistant coach.

On November 27, 2017, Van Tol was named the head baseball coach at Boise State University. Van Tol is the first coach the Broncos have had since 1980, when the school disbanded the program. Van Tol had two years to prepare the Broncos for competition in 2020.

Head coaching record

References

External links

 Boise State Broncos profile

Living people
1967 births
Treasure Valley Chukars baseball players
Gonzaga Bulldogs baseball players
Gonzaga Bulldogs baseball coaches
Centralia Trailblazers baseball coaches
Treasure Valley Chukars baseball coaches
Portland Pilots baseball coaches
Minor league baseball coaches
Boise State Broncos baseball coaches